Arthur Clark (8 September 1900 – 25 April 1979) was a British athlete. He competed in the men's 3000 metres team race event at the 1924 Summer Olympics.

References

External links
 

1900 births
1979 deaths
Athletes (track and field) at the 1924 Summer Olympics
British male middle-distance runners
Olympic athletes of Great Britain
Sportspeople from Warwickshire